Soldadu Mohammad Tarmizi bin Haji Mat Johari (born 26 December 1983) is a Bruneian footballer who  last played for MS ABDB and the Brunei national team as a goalkeeper. He had a brief spell with professional club Brunei DPMM FC in 2014.

Club career
Tarmizi began playing league football with QAF FC, then transferred to the football team of the Royal Brunei Armed Forces, MS ABDB from the 2007-08 season onwards. He has won four league titles and six FA Cups with the Armymen to date.

Tarmizi moved to Brunei DPMM FC in early 2014 to serve as third-choice goalkeeper behind Wardun Yussof and Azman Ilham Noor. He was released and promptly rejoined MS ABDB after the season ended.

International career
Tarmizi was first selected for the Brunei national football team at the 2018 World Cup qualifying matches against Chinese Taipei in early 2015. He became a regular squad member for the Wasps but was finally handed his first appearance at the 2016 AFC Solidarity Cup held in Malaysia. At the semi-final against Macau on 12 November, first-choice goalkeeper Wardun Yussof was sent off for a foul outside the box, Tarmizi conceded the resulting free-kick after a deflection. He held on between the goalposts until the game went to penalties, where Brunei missed twice to lose the shootout 4–3. He started the ensuing third place match which Brunei was defeated 3–2.

Tarmizi was selected for the 2018 AFF Suzuki Cup qualification matches against Timor-Leste in September.

Honours
MS ABDB
 Brunei Super League (4): 2015, 2016, 2017–18, 2018–19
 Brunei FA Cup (6): 2007–08, 2009–10, 2012, 2014–15, 2015, 2016
 Sumbangsih Cup: 2016

References

External links

1983 births
Living people
Association football goalkeepers
Bruneian military personnel
Bruneian footballers
Brunei international footballers
DPMM FC players
MS ABDB players